In computing, storage allocation may refer to:

 Memory management
 Register allocation
 Storage Resource Management